HMS Quorn, the third ship of this name, was a  of the Royal Navy. She was launched on 23 January 1988, as the last ship of her class.

Operational history
On 18 March 2007, she was presented with the Freedom of the Borough scroll in Melton Mowbray, Leicestershire.

From May 2011 to September 2014, Quorn was deployed to the Persian Gulf as part of the Royal Navy's permanent presence in the region. Based in Bahrain, Quorns crew changed every six months enabling the ship to remain on station for a prolonged period without the costs associated with returning to the United Kingdom. During the deployment, Quorn was "twinned" with American minehunter .

Quorn spent the late spring and summer of 2015 on deployment in northern European waters, including the Baltic Sea as part of Standing NATO Mine Countermeasures Group One (SNMCMG1).

After spending a period alongside in extended readiness, Quorn was lifted out of the water into the "Minor War Vessels Centre of Specialisation"; the former shipbuilding hall at HMNB Portsmouth in December 2016. However, in October 2017 it was revealed that her planned refit would not take place, and Quorn would be decommissioned on 14 December 2017.

Lithuanian Navy
On 30 April 2020 Defence Equipment Services announced she had been sold for £1 million to the Lithuanian Navy. In July 2022 the Ministry of Defence announced that Harland & Wolff  Appledore had been awarded the £55 million contract to renovate and restore the ship to an operational state.

Affiliations
 Ipswich, Suffolk
 Melton Mowbray, Leicestershire
 Quorn, Leicestershire
 The Quorn Hunt

References

External links

 

Hunt-class mine countermeasures vessels
1988 ships